Richard Clyde Taylor (November 5, 1919 – October 30, 2003), was an American philosopher renowned for his contributions to metaphysics. He was also an internationally known beekeeper.

Biography
Taylor received his PhD at Brown University, where his supervisor was Roderick Chisholm. He taught at Brown University, Columbia and the University of Rochester, and had visiting appointments at about a dozen other institutions. His best-known book was Metaphysics (1963). Other works included Action and Purpose (1966), Good and Evil (1970) and Virtue Ethics (1991). Professor Taylor was also the editor of The Will to Live: Selected Writings of Arthur Schopenhauer. He was an enthusiastic advocate of virtue ethics. He also wrote influential papers on the meaning of life, which, like Albert Camus, he explored through an examination of the myth of Sisyphus.

Taylor's 1962 essay "Fatalism" was the subject of David Foster Wallace's undergraduate thesis at Amherst College, published in 2011 together with Taylor's essay and contemporary responses under the title Fate, Time, and Language: An Essay on Free Will.  Please see also ‘’Restoring Pride: The Lost Virtue of Our Age (1996)’’ Prometheus Books

Taylor made significant contributions to beekeeping. He owned three hundred hives of bees and, from 1970, produced mostly comb honey. He explained his management techniques in several books, including The Comb Honey Book and The Joys of Beekeeping.

In 1993, he debated William Lane Craig over the subject 'Is The Basis For Morality Natural or Supernatural?'.

Notable philosophers who studied under Taylor as graduate students include Norman Bowie, Myles Brand, Keith Lehrer, and Peter van Inwagen.

Death
Taylor died at the age of 83 on October 30, 2003, in his home in Trumansburg, New York due to complications ensuing from lung cancer.

Publications
Included among Richard Taylors publications are the following texts:

 The Will to Live: Selected Writings of Arthur Schopenhauer. Ed. Richard Tayler.(1962)
 Metaphysics by Richard Taylor (1963)
 On the Basis of Morality by Arthur Schopenhauer, Richard Taylor, E. F. J. Payne (1965)
 Action and Purpose by Richard Taylor (1966)
 Freedom and Determinism. Ed. Richard Taylor (1966)
Good and Evil: A New Direction by Richard Taylor (1970)
 Freedom, Anarchy, and the Law: An Introduction to Political Philosophy by Richard Taylor (1973)
 On the Fourfold Root of the Principle of Sufficient Reason. Arthur Schopenhauer. Introduction by Richard Taylor (1974) <ref>[https://www.worldcat.org/title/872602 On the Fourfold Root of the Principle of Sufficient Reason Introduction by Richard Taylor, Open Court, La Salle, Illinois, 1974 on worldcat.org]</ref>
 Ethics, Faith and Reason'' by Richard Taylor (1985)

See also
American philosophy
List of American philosophers

References

Further reading

External links

 — Article on David Foster Wallace's analysis of Taylor's fatalism.
 Richard Taylor's publications on JSTOR.org
Richard Taylor's publications on Philpapers.org

1919 births
2003 deaths
20th-century American philosophers
American beekeepers
American philosophy academics
American atheists
Brown University alumni
Brown University faculty
Columbia University faculty
Metaphysicians
21st-century American philosophers
Virtue ethicists
American ethicists
Deaths from lung cancer in New York (state)
University of Rochester faculty